C. Stuart Houston (September 26, 1927 – July 22, 2021) was an American-born Canadian physician, professor emeritus of medicine in radiology, award-winning ornithologist, historian, and writer. He was awarded the 1990 Eisenmann Medal and was made an officer of the Order of Canada in 1993.

Biography
Houston's parents Clarence J. Houston, M.D. and Sigridur (Sigga) Christianson Houston, M.D. jointly operated a general medical practice in Watford City, North Dakota. (In 1925 she was the first Icelandic-Canadian woman to receive an M.D. degree.) In 1928 the family moved to Yorkton, Saskatchewan, where Houston's parents started another medical practice.  He was born in Williston, North Dakota and after completing his secondary education at the Yorkton Collegiate Institute, Houston earned his bachelor's degree at the University of Manitoba and graduated there with an M.D. in 1951. In 1951 he married Mary Isabel Belcher and the two moved to Yorkton, where he joined his parents' medical practice. He practised medicine from 1951 to 1955 in Yorkton, studied internal medicine and pediatrics for the academic year 1955–1956 at Saskatoon's Royal University Hospital, and practiced from 1956 to 1960 again in Yorkton.

In 1960, Houston moved with his family to Saskatoon where he began training in diagnostic radiology at Saskatoon's Royal University Hospital. With the support of a George Von L. Meyer Memorial Scholarship, he later studied for a year in affiliation with Harvard Medical School at Children’s Hospital Boston. He joined in 1964 the department of diagnostic radiology at the University of Saskatchewan, where he became a professor in 1969 and retired in 1996 as professor emeritus. He was head of the department of medical imaging from July 1982 to June 1987.

Houston and his wife Mary banded about 155,000 different birds from about 200 different species. They made about 3,100 recoveries. He also holds records for the most bandings of turkey vultures and great horned owls. Mary Houston banded 5,385 Bohemian waxwings, which in 2017 was more than the next three competitors combined. Houston and Farley Mowat once worked together banding birds and Mowat sent him a field guide.

Houston is the author or coauthor of more than 250 articles in medicine or the history of medicine. He wrote three chapters for the book Pediatric Skeletal Radiology (1991). He is the author or coauthor of over 500 publications in ornithology or natural history. He edited three books about the Franklin expedition, based on the diaries and paintings of midshipmen George Back and Robert Hood (who died on the Coppermine expedition), and naturalist John Richardson. Stuart is the author or coauthor of several other books, including Birds of Saskatchewan (2020). His wife Mary would often improve his prose after he wrote a first draft of the facts.

Mary Isabel Houston
Mary Isabel Belcher (November 7, 1924 - July 19, 2019) was born at her family's farm near Dilke, Saskatchewan. After graduating from the University of Saskatchewan, she taught for three years at the Yorkton Collegiate Institute. After marrying Houston in August 1951, she worked with him, until nearly the end of her life, on bird banding and on much of his writing. 

She banded not only thousands of Bohemian waxwings, but also thousands of mountain bluebirds, tree swallows, purple martins, ring-billed gulls, California gulls, cormorants, and pelicans. She received in 1988 the Douglas H. Pimlott Conservation Award from the Canadian Nature Federation, in 1996 the Meewasin Conservation Award from the Meewasin Valley Authority, and in 2005 the Saskatchewan Volunteer Medal and Saskatchewan Centennial Medal from the province of Saskatchewan. In 2011 she was inducted into the Saskatoon Women's Hall of Fame.

Stuart and Mary Houston had three sons and a daughter. One son graduated from Queen's University at Kingston with a master's degree in science, and their daughter and other two sons graduated with M.D. degrees from the University of Saskatchewan. Upon Mary Houston's death she was survived by her widower, their four children, nine grandchildren, and one great-grandchild.

Selected publications

Articles on history of medicine

Articles on medicine

Articles on ornithology

Books
 
 
 
 
 
 
 
 
 with Merle Massie: 
 
 <ref>{{cite web|title=Summary of Tommy's team|website=Toronto Public Library|url=https://www.torontopubliclibrary.ca/detail.jsp?Entt=RDM2693733&R=2693733}}</ref>
  (Birds of Saskatchewan'' is one of five books shortlisted as nominees for the 2020 Regina Public Library Book of the Year Award.)

References

1927 births
2021 deaths
Canadian ornithologists
Canadian radiologists
20th-century Canadian physicians
21st-century Canadian physicians
Medical historians
University of Manitoba alumni
Academic staff of the University of Saskatchewan